The Colíder Dam is a rock-fill dam with an asphalt-concrete core, built from 2011 to 2019 on the Teles Pires river. The dam's hydroelectric power stations have 3 turbines each 102.3 MW, resulting in a total installed capacity of 306.9 MW. Construction on the run-of-the-river type station was initiated in May 2011, and the last unit started operating in December 2019.

The dam is part of a planned six power plant "Hidrovia Tapajos/Teles Pires" project to create a navigable waterway connecting the interior of Brazil to the Atlantic Ocean.  
The waterway will consist of five dams on the Teles Pires river:  Magessi Dam,  Sinop Dam,  Colíder Dam,  Teles Pires Dam,  Sao Manoel Dam) and the  Foz do Apiacas Dam on the Apiacas river.

The Colíder Dam, Sinop Dam and Teles Pires Dam are built, while the smaller upstream dams are still in the planning stages by 2019.

Design
The Colíder Dam will be a combination embankment dam with concrete sections for the power stations and spillway. The length of the entire dam will be .  The dam will utilize 4.7 million cubic meters of earth and 260 thousand cubic meters of concrete, and will impound a reservoir with a surface area of 182.8 square kilometers.  The power plant is being constructed by the Brazilian utility Companhia Paranaense de Energia (Copel).

Environmental Impacts

To reduce emissions of methane, a powerful greenhouse gas, 82 square kilometers of vegetation were cleared before the reservoir was filled.

See also

List of power stations in Brazil

References

Dams in Mato Grosso
Rock-filled dams
Hydroelectric power stations in Brazil
Run-of-the-river power stations